Choristoneura murinana is a moth of the family Tortricidae. It is found in central Europe and the Near East, China (Heilongjiang, Gansu, Qinghai), Taiwan and in North America.

The wingspan is 17–24 mm. There is one generation per year.

The larvae feed on Abies alba, Abies nephrolepis and in North America also Cedrus Juniperus Picea, Pinus and Pseudotsuga species. Young larvae feed on new shoot of their host plant. Pupation takes place on the ground near the host. The species overwinters as a young larva.

References

External links
Microlepidoptera
Canadian Food Inspection Agency

Choristoneura
Moths of Europe